Mbati, also known as Songo, is the principal Bantu language spoken in the Central African Republic, along the Ubangi River in the extreme south of the country.

References

Ngondi-Ngiri languages
Languages of the Central African Republic